This is a list of Japanese animation studios.

A

B
 Bandai Namco Pictures (株式会社バンダイナムコピクチャーズ)
 
 Bibury Animation Studios (合同会社バイブリーアニメーションスタジオ)
 Blue Lynx (ブルーリンクス)
 Bones (ボンズ)

C
 C-Station (シーステイション株式会社)
 C2C
 Chaos Project (カオスプロジェクト)
 CloverWorks (株式会社CloverWorks)
 CoMix Wave Films (コミックス・ウェーブ・フィル)
 Connect (コネクト)
 Creators in Pack (株式会社クリエイターズインパック)
 CygamesPictures (株式会社CygamesPictures)

D
 Daume (童夢)
 David Production (デイヴィッドプロダクション )
 Digital Frontier (デジタルフロンティア)
 Diomedéa (ディオメディア)
 DLE (株式会社ディー・エル・イー)
 Doga Kobo (動画工房)
 Drive (株式会社ドライブ)

E
 
 Eiken (エイケン)
 Ekachi Epilka (株式会社エカチエピルカ)
 EMT Squared (株式会社EMTスクエアード)
 Encourage Films (株式会社エンカレッジフィルムズ)
 ENGI (株式会社エンギ)
 Ezo'la (株式会社Ezo'la)

F
 Fanworks (株式会社ファンワークス)
 Feel (フィール)
 Felix Film (株式会社FelixFilm)

G
 Gaina (株式会社ガイナ)
 Gainax (ガイナックス)
 Gallop (ぎゃろっぷ)
 Gathering (ギャザリング株式会社)
 Geek Toys (株式会社ギークトイズ)
 GEMBA (株式会社ゲンバ)
 Geno Studio (ジェノスタジオ)
 GoHands (株式会社GoHands)
 Gonzo (ゴンゾ)
 Graphinica (グラフィニカ)
 Grizzly (株式会社 GRIZZLY)
 Group TAC (グループ・タック)

H
 Hal Film Maker (ハルフィルムメーカー)
 Hoods Entertainment (フッズエンタテインメント)

I
 Imagin (イマジン)

J
 J.C.Staff (ジェー・シー・スタッフ)

K
 Khara (株式会社カラ)
 Kinema Citrus (キネマシトラス)
 Kitty Films  (キティ・フィルム)
 Knack Productions (ナック)
 Kokusai Eiga-sha (国際映画社)
 Kyoto Animation (京都アニメーション)

L
 Lapin Track (ラパントラック)
 Larx Entertainment (株式会社ラークスエンタテインメント)
 Lay-duce (株式会社Lay-duce)
 Lerche (株式会社ラルケ)
 Lesprit (株式会社レスプリ)
 Liden Films (株式会社ライデンフィルム)

M
 Madhouse (マッドハウス)
 Magia Doraglier (マギア・ドラグリエ)
 Magic Bus (マジックバス)
 Maho Film (株式会社Maho Film)
 Manglobe (マングローブ)
 MAPPA (株式会社MAPPA)
 Millepensee (ミルパンセ)
 Mook Animation (ムークアニメーション)
 M.S.C (エム・エス・シー)
 Mushi Production (虫プロダクション)

N
 NAZ (株式会社NAZ)
 Nexus (株式会社Nexus)
 Nippon Animation (日本アニメーション)
 Nomad (ノーマッド)
 NUT (株式会社ナット)

O
 Oh! Production (OH!プロダクション or オープロダクション)
 Okuruto Noboru (株式会社オクルトノボル)
 OLM (オー・エル・エム)
 Orange (有限会社オレンジ)
 Ordet (株式会社Ordet)

P
 P.A. Works (ピーエーワークス)
 Pacific Animation Corporation
 Palm Studio (有限会社パルムスタジオ)
 Passione (パッショーネ)
 Pierrot (ぴえろ)
 Pine Jam (パインジャム PINE JAM)
 Platinum Vision (プラチナビジョン株式会社)
 Polygon Pictures (株式会社ポリゴン・ピクチュアズ)
 Production I.G (プロダクション・アイジー)
 Production IMS (株式会社プロダクションアイムズ)
 Project No.9 (株式会社project No.9)

R
Radix (ラディクス)
Revoroot (株式会社レヴォルト)

S
 Sanzigen (株式会社サンジゲン)
 Satelight (サテライト)
 Science SARU (サイエンスSARU)
 Seven (セブン)
 Seven Arcs (株式会社Seven Arcs)
 Shaft (シャフト)
 Shin-Ei Animation (シンエイ動画)
 Shirogumi (株式会社白組)
 Shogakukan Music & Digital Entertainment (小学館ミュージック&デジタル エンタテイメント)
 Shuka (朱夏)
 Signal.MD (株式会社シグナル・エムディ)
 Silver Link (株式会社SILVER LINK.)
 Sola Digital Arts (株式会社 SOLA DIGITAL ARTS)
 Studio 3Hz (株式会社3Hz)
 Studio 4°C (株式会社STUDIO 4℃)
 Studio A-Cat (株式会社studio A-CAT)
 Studio Bind (株式会社スタジオバインド)
 Studio Blanc (株式会社スタジオブラン)
 Studio Chizu (スタジオ地図)
 Studio Colorido (株式会社スタジオコロリド)
 Studio Comet (スタジオコメット)
 Studio Deen (スタジオディーン)
 Studio Fantasia (スタジオ・ファンタジア)
 Studio Ghibli (スタジオジブリ)
 Studio Gokumi (Studio五組)
 Studio Hibari (スタジオ雲雀)
 Studio Kai (スタジオKAI)
 Studio Live (スタジオ・ライブ)
 Studio Nue (スタジオぬえ)
 Studio Ponoc (スタジオポノック)
 Studio Puyukai (スタジオぷYUKAI)
 Studio Signpost (株式会社スタジオ サインポスト)
 Studio Trigger (トリガー)
 Studio VOLN (株式会社studio VOLN)
 Sunrise (サンライズ)
 SynergySP (有限会社SynergySP)

T
 Tatsunoko Production (竜の子プロダクション )
 Tear Studio (株式会社ティアスタジオ)
 Telecom Animation Film (テレコムアニメーションフィルム)
 Tezuka Productions (手塚プロダクション)
 TMS Entertainment (トムス・エンタテインメント)
 TNK (ティー・エヌ・ケー)
 Toei Animation (東映アニメーション)
 Top Craft (トップクラフト)
 Trans Arts (トランス・アーツ)
 Triangle Staff (トライアングルスタッフ)
 Troyca (トロイカ)
 Tsuchida Production (土田プロダクション)
 Typhoon Graphics (株式会社颱風グラフィックス)

U
 Ufotable (ユーフォーテーブル)

V
 Vega Entertainment (ベガエンタテイメント)
 Video Tokyo Productions (ビデオ東京プロダクション)

W
 Walt Disney Animation Japan (ウォルト ・ ディズニー ・ アニメーション日本)
 Walt Disney Television International Japan (ウォルト ・ ディズニー ・ テレビジョンインターナショナル ・ ジャパン)
 WAO World (ワオワールド)
 White Fox (株式会社WHITE FOX)
 Wit Studio (ウィットスタジオ)

X
 Xebec (ジーベック)

Y
 Yaoyorozu (ヤオヨロズ株式会社)
 Yokohama Animation Laboratory (株式会社横浜アニメーションラボ)
 Yostar Pictures (株式会社)
 Yumeta Company (ユメタカンパニー)

Z
 Zero-G (株式会社ゼロジー)
 Zexcs (ゼクシズ)

See also
List of anime directors
List of animation studios

References

External links
 Searchable database of Japanese anime companies